Shabkhus Lat Rural District is a rural district (dehestan) in Rankuh District, Amlash County, Gilan Province, Iran. At the 2006 census, its population was 11,201, in 3,085 families. The rural district has 35 villages.

References 

Rural Districts of Gilan Province
Amlash County